Valery Dvoryaninov (born 6 November 1947) is a Soviet equestrian. He competed in two events at the 1976 Summer Olympics.

References

1947 births
Living people
Soviet male equestrians
Olympic equestrians of the Soviet Union
Equestrians at the 1976 Summer Olympics
Sportspeople from Tashkent